Minas Pitsos (born 18 October 1980) is a former professional Greek football player, who played as a left-back. He spent the majority of his career representing clubs of his hometown Heraklion across various levels of the Greek football league system, with a short spell in Athens-based Greek giants Panathinaikos. He currently holds the position of technical director at OFI Crete's U-19 squad.

Career

OFI Crete
Pitsos began his football career in the youth teams of his local side OFI Crete and signed his first professional contract with the club in 1998, aged 18 years old. He made his official debut on 9 November 2000, playing in the 2nd leg of the 2000–01 UEFA Cup Second Round vs. Slavia Prague. His domestic league debut came four days later, during a 2000–01 Alpha Ethniki match vs. Skoda Xanthi.

Panathinaikos
In January 2002, Pitsos was transferred to Panathinaikos, after impressing with his performance during a league match vs. Egaleo held in Panathinaikos' home ground, Apostolos Nikolaidis Stadium. His debut for the "Greens" came on 9 February 2002 in a 0–1 away win vs. his former club OFI Crete. Ten days later, he would make his debut in the UEFA Champions League, playing the full 90 minutes during a Group Stage away win vs. Sparta Praha. However, as he was not considered as a first choice of Panathinaikos manager Sergio Markarián, who replaced Fernando Santos in October 2002, Pitsos, who had made a total of just 6 appearances during the 2002–03 season, decided to terminate his contract with Panathinaikos and return to OFI to get more playing time.

Back to OFI
Pitsos spent the next 9 years at a declining OFI Crete, during which he played in over 170 matches. In his second spell with the club, he played in the 2007 UEFA Intertoto Cup, making his final two appearances in European competitions, as well as the Greek 2nd Division, as the club went into a meltdown and was relegated at the end of the 2008–09 season. Pitsos eventually returned to top flight with OFI, as the club promoted to the Superleague after spending two years in the Football League. However, OFI's financial obligations to former players resulted in the club failing to obtain a licence to enter the transfer market, and thus Pitsos' contract ended in 2012, and could not be renewed.

Ergotelis
As a free agent, Pitsos signed a contract with OFI's local rival Ergotelis, at the time playing in the Football League. Pitsos was instrumental in Ergotelis' eventual promotion to the Superleague, making 32 appearances and scoring two goals, thus earning a contract renewal deal by the club. He stayed at the club for an additional 3 years, following Ergotelis back to the Football League after the club was relegated at the end of the 2014–15 season and was one of just 17 players to remain part of the club's roster as Ergotelis' financial issues finally forced the club to withdraw from professional competitions in January 2016. As a result, Pitsos, along with the rest of the club roster, were released from their contracts.

Return to OFI
Aged nearly 36, Pitsos, who had previously expressed his wish to end his career with OFI Crete, signed with his former club, now playing in the Greek 3rd Division, on 29 January 2016. After winning the division title, Pitsos announced his retirement on 6 July 2016. He was immediately offered, and currently holds the position of technical director at OFI's U-19 squad.

Career statistics

References

External links
Insports profile 

1980 births
Living people
Panathinaikos F.C. players
OFI Crete F.C. players
Ergotelis F.C. players
Super League Greece players
Greece youth international footballers
Greece under-21 international footballers
Association football defenders
Footballers from Heraklion
Greek footballers